Pickaway is an unincorporated community in Monroe County, West Virginia, United States. Pickaway is located on U.S. Route 219, northeast of Union.

The community was named after Ohio's Pickaway Plains region. The Pickaway Rural Historic District was listed on the National Register of Historic Places in 1999.

References

Unincorporated communities in Monroe County, West Virginia
Unincorporated communities in West Virginia